SABIS is an education management organization that operates schools in 20 countries on five continents in both the private and public sectors  and licenses a proprietary education program. According to the company, schools in the SABIS Network educate over 70,000 students and implement a proven, proprietary system.

History

The story of SABIS dates back to 1886 when the International School of Choueifat  was founded in the village of Choueifat, a suburb of Beirut, Lebanon. What started as a school for girls founded by the Reverend Tanios Saad and Ms. Louisa Proctor soon started accepting boys as well.

The International School of Choueifat survived two world wars and began a program outside Lebanon in the mid-1970s.

Expansion

Expansion of the network outside of Lebanon began in the mid-1970s by Alaa Kamal. In 1976, SABIS opened its first school outside of Lebanon in Sharjah, in the U.A.E. In the UAE, the organization currently operates The International Schools of Choueifat and SABIS International Schools, located in six of the emirates.

In 2019, SABIS announced a deal with Arada to launch a K–12 international school in Aljada, Sharjah’s largest lifestyle megaproject.

SABIS also operates a number of schools in the Kingdom of Saudi Arabia, in Lahore, Pakistan; in Frankfurt Rhein-Main, Germany, and in Neuss, Germany. It also operated a school in Bath, U.K., which closed down in 2018. In 2015, SABIS opened a school in Azerbaijan.

In Sub-Saharan Africa, SABIS is in partnership with Africa Crest Education (ACE) Holdings.

In Latin America, SABIS announced its plans to tap into the Brazilian market in 2018, with a $50 million investment project.

The SABIS International School – Costa Verde in Panama opened its doors in September 2017.

SABIS operates six schools in the United States: five public charter schools (in Arizona, Massachusetts, and Michigan) and one private school in Minnesota. In 2013, SABIS started educating students at the Collegiate Charter School of Lowell (Collegiate), in Lowell, Massachusetts.

References 

Charter schools
Educational institutions established in 1886
Companies based in Minnesota
Charter schools in the United States
Education companies of the United States
Education reform
Education management organizations
Charter management organizations
1886 establishments in the Ottoman Empire